Since the 1870s, mayoral elections have been held every two years to elect the mayor of New Haven, Connecticut.

Elections before 2013

2013
 
The 2013 New Haven, Connecticut mayoral election was held on November 5, 2013. It saw the reelection of Democrat Toni Harp, who became the city's first female mayor.

Ten-term incumbent mayor John DeStefano Jr. did not run for reelection.

Democratic primary
The Democratic primary was held on September 10.

Voter turnout in the primary was estimated at 29%.

Candidates that were on the ballot were state senator Toni Harp, political newcomer Justin Elicker, economic development administrator Henry Fernandez, and Hillhouse High School principal Kermit Carolina. Candidates that had been running for the nomination, but withdrew before the primary, were Matthew Nemerson, state representative Gary Holder-Winfield and Sundiata Keitazulu.

General election
After losing to Harp in the Democratic primary, Justin Elicker ran against her again in the general election as an independent candidate.

2015
 
The 2015 New Haven, Connecticut mayoral election was held on November 3, 2015. It saw the reelection of Democratic incumbent Toni Harp to a second term.

Voter turnout was less than 20%.

Harp won all of the city's 30 wards.

2017

 
The 2017 New Haven, Connecticut mayoral election was held on November 8, 2017. It saw the reelection of Democratic incumbent Toni Harp to a third term.

Democratic primary
The Democratic primary was held on September 12. Voter turnout was roughly 20%.

General election
Paca, who had lost the Democratic primary to Harp, ran as an indepdendent. While he remained on the ballot, and ultimately placed second, he had withdrawn before the election.

Harp won all of the city's 30 wards.

2019

The 2019 New Haven, Connecticut mayoral election was held on November 5, 2019. Third-term incumbent mayor Toni Harp was defeated by Justin Elicker in both the Democratic primary and the general election. Ellicker and Harp had previously faced each other in the 2013 mayoral election.

Democratic primary
The Democratic primary was held on September 10.

General election

Results by ward

2021

The 2021 New Haven, Connecticut mayoral election was held on November 2, 2021. Incumbent mayor Justin Elicker won reelection.

Democratic primary
Justin Elicker was renominated.

In late July, three developments occurred, which left Elicker without an opponent in the primary. Karen DuBois-Walton, the CEO of Elm City Communities (the city's public housing authority), who had been running a campaign for the nomination, withdrew from the race. Mayce Torres, a two-time aldermanic candidate, who was running in the Democratic primary, switched over to the Republican primary. Elena Tej Grewel, who had previously formed an exploratory committee for a prospective run, announced that she would not be running. Before DuBois-Walton's withdrawal, it had been anticipated the primary contest between Ellicker and her would have been competitive.

Republican primary
In July 2021, Mayce Torres, who had previously been running for the Democratic nomination, announced that she would instead be running for the Republican nomination.

2023

The 2023 New Haven, Connecticut mayoral election will be held in November 2023. Incumbent mayor Justin Elicker is running for re-election to a third term in office.

Democratic primary

Declared
Shafiq Abdussabur, former Beaver Hills alderman
Liam Brennan, Hartford Inspector General and former assistant U.S. Attorney
Justin Elicker, incumbent mayor
Tom Goldenberg, management consultant

Independents

Declared
Wendy Hamilton, community activist

References